Dejan Radić may refer to:
 Dejan Radić (footballer) (born 1980), Serbian footballer
 Dejan Radić (volleyball) (born 1984), Serbian volleyball player